Algiers Agreement may refer to:

1975 Algiers Agreement, between Iraq and Iran
Algiers Agreement (1979), between Mauritania and the Polisario Front
Algiers Agreement (2000), between Eritrea and Ethiopia
Algiers Accords (1981), between the US and Iran